Ridgewood is a village in Bergen County, in the U.S. state of New Jersey. As of the 2020 United States census, the village's population was 25,979, an increase of 1,021 (+4.1%) from the 2010 census count of 24,958, which in turn reflected an increase of 22 (+0.1%) from 24,936 in the 2000 census.

It has been one of the state's highest-income communities. In 2000, its per capita income of $51,658 was ranked the 35th-highest in the state. Based on data from the 2006–2010 American Community Survey, it had a per-capita income of $67,560, 31st in the state. Based on data from the American Community Survey for 2013–2017, it had a median household income of $162,011, ranked 7th in the state among municipalities with more than 10,000 residents, more than double the statewide median of $76,475.

Ridgewood was ranked 26th in Money magazine's "Best Places to Live" in 2011.

History
In 1700, Johannes Van Emburgh built the first home in Ridgewood, having purchased a  property in 1698.

The Village of Ridgewood was created on November 20, 1894, with the same boundaries as Ridgewood Township, also in Bergen County. The Village became the municipal government while the Township remained a school district. In 1902, the village added portions of Orvil Township, which were returned to Orvil Township in 1915. In 1925, Ridgewood Village acquired area from Franklin Township (remainder now dissolved as Wyckoff). On February 9, 1971, Ridgewood acquired area from Washington Township. On May 28, 1974, it acquired area from Ho-Ho-Kus. The name of the village derives from the characteristics of its terrain.

In 2014, former Ridgewood Public Works Inspector Thomas Rica was convicted of stealing over $460,000 in coins collected from the village's parking meters. Rica was ordered to pay the entire amount back to the village and was permanently barred from seeking public employment in the state of New Jersey.

Historic sites
Ridgewood is home to the following locations on the National Register of Historic Places:
 Ackerman House (222 Doremus Avenue) – 222 Doremus Avenue (added 1983) was constructed by Johannes and Jemima Ackerman  on their  property and remained in the Ackerman family until the 1920s.
 Ackerman House (252 Lincoln Avenue) – 252 Lincoln Avenue (added 1983) is a stone house constructed  and named for either David or John Ackerman.
 David Ackerman House – 415 East Saddle River Road (added 1983).
 Ackerman-Van Emburgh House – 789 East Glen Avenue (added 1983) was built  by John Ackerman and purchased by the Van Embergh family in 1816.
 Archibald-Vroom House – 160 East Ridgewood Avenue (added 1984).
 Beech Street School – 49 Cottage Place (added 1998).
 Paramus Reformed Church Historic District – Bounded by Franklin Turnpike, Route 17, Saddle River, south side of cemetery and Glen Avenue (added 1975). The Old Paramus Reformed Church was established in 1725, though the current building dates to 1800. During the Revolutionary War, the church was used for several years by the Continental Army, and in 1778 it was the site of the court-martial of General Charles Lee.
 Rathbone-Zabriskie House – 570 North Maple Avenue (added 1983).
 Ridgewood Station – Garber Square (added 1984).
 Van Dien House – 627 Grove Street (added 1983).
 Vanderbeck House – 249 Prospect Street (added 1983).
 Westervelt-Cameron House – 26 East Glen Avenue (added 1983), constructed  by John R. Westervelt.
 Historic Graydon Pool – Located at the corner of North Maple Ave & Linwood Ave

Geography
According to the United States Census Bureau, the village had a total area of 5.80 square miles (15.03 km2), including 5.74 square miles (14.87 km2) of land and 0.06 square miles (0.16 km2) of water (1.07%).

Ridgewood is adjacent to nine municipalities, eight in Bergen County − Fair Lawn, Glen Rock, Ho-Ho-Kus, Midland Park, Wyckoff, Paramus, Waldwick and Washington Township − and Hawthorne in Passaic County.

Neighborhoods 
Ridgewood's neighborhoods include:
 Downtown – The central business district of Ridgewood, "Town" is centered on East Ridgewood Avenue. This area is home to the most iconic buildings in Ridgewood, such as the Wilsey building and the Moore Building.
 Scrabbletown – Located between East Glen Avenue, Franklin Turnpike, and the Ho-Ho-Kus Brook.
 The Old Country Club – Located between Goffle Road, Rock Road, Lincoln Avenue and Godwin Avenue. It is near the Midland Park border.
 The View – Area on and to the west of Ridgewood's highest point, an unnamed ridge known for its skyline views of New York City.
 Upper Ridgewood – Located north of West Glen Avenue and west of the NJ Transit Main Line tracks.
 Salem Ridge – Located East of Route 17.
 Floral Park – Located between Grove Street, South Pleasant, East Ridgewood Avenue and South Van Dien Street.
 Brookside
 The Lawns – A loosely defined area in southern Ridgewood surrounding Hawes Elementary School.

Climate 
Ridgewood has a hot-summer humid continental climate (Dfa) and the hardiness zone is 7a bordering on 6b.

Demographics

2020 census
In the 2020 United States census, the population of Ridgewood was reported at 25,979, an increase of 1,121 people since the 2010 Census. Based on data from the 2015-2019 American Community Survey, it was reported that there were 8,300 households in the village. The average number of persons per household was 3.01. 96.8% of the households owned a computer. 96.5% of the population (age 25+) graduated high school and 76.0% have a Bachelor's degree. 78.8% of the population was White, 15.5% were Asian, 7.9% were Hispanic or Latino, and 1.2% were Black or African American.

2010 census

The Census Bureau's 2006–2010 American Community Survey showed that (in 2010 inflation-adjusted dollars) median household income was $143,229 (with a margin of error of +/− $10,530) and the median family income was $172,825 (+/− $9,197). Males had a median income of $111,510 (+/− $12,513) versus $77,651 (+/− $9,008) for females. The per capita income for the village was $67,560 (+/− $3,740). About 2.2% of families and 3.3% of the population were below the poverty line, including 2.4% of those under age 18 and 4.3% of those age 65 or over.

Same-sex couples headed 38 households in 2010, an increase from the 22 counted in 2000.

2000 census
As of the 2000 United States census there were 24,936 people, 8,603 households, and 6,779 families residing in the village. The population density was 4,308.9 people per square mile (1,662.8/km2). There were 8,802 housing units at an average density of 1,521.0 per square mile (587.0/km2). The racial makeup of the village was 87.82% White, 1.64% African American, 0.04% Native American, 8.67% Asian, 0.59% from other races, and 1.23% from two or more races. Hispanic or Latino of any race were 3.78% of the population.

There were 8,603 households, out of which 44.3% had children under the age of 18 living with them, 69.4% were married couples living together, 7.2% had a female householder with no husband present, and 21.2% were non-families. 18.5% of all households were made up of individuals, and 8.8% had someone living alone who was 65 years of age or older. The average household size was 2.87 and the average family size was 3.30.

In the village, the population was spread out, with 30.0% under the age of 18, 4.4% from 18 to 24, 27.5% from 25 to 44, 25.9% from 45 to 64, and 12.2% who were 65 years of age or older. The median age was 39 years. For every 100 females, there were 92.8 males. For every 100 females age 18 and over, there were 88.5 males.

The median income for a household in the village was $104,286, and the median income for a family was $121,848. Males had a median income of $90,422 versus $50,248 for females. The per capita income for the village was $51,658. 3.0% of the population and 1.8% of families were below the poverty line, including 2.5% of those under age 18 and 4.3% of those age 65 or over.

Arts and culture
The indie rock band Real Estate was described by The Record as "Ridgewood's best-known musical export".

Parks and recreation
Park facilities in Ridgewood include:
Graydon Park, located between Linwood and North Maple Avenues, includes a beach park pool, baseball field, soccer field, and roller rink.
Veterans Field, located next to the library and police station, includes four baseball and softball fields, as well as a bandshell offering free concerts. The Ridgewood High School baseball team plays its home games here.
Citizens Park, located across the street from George Washington Middle School, includes two baseball fields and a soccer field. The hill is often used in the winter for sledding.
Ridgewood Wild Duck Pond, part of Bergen's Saddle River County Park, is located on East Ridgewood Avenue between Paramus Road and Pershing Avenue. Amenities include circular path with bench seating around duck pond, picnic pavilion, additional picnic areas, children's playground, fenced-in dog park, restroom facilities and entrance to a 6-mile, multi-use bike & pedestrian pathway. This pathway connects Ridgewood Duck Pond with five other areas along the Saddle River County Park: Glen Rock, Fair Lawn, Paramus, Rochelle Park and Saddle Brook. Fishing (NJ state license required) and ice skating are allowed at pond when conditions permit. The water is treated with certain chemicals, however, and swimming is strictly prohibited.

Government

Local government
Ridgewood is governed within the Faulkner Act (formally known as the Optional Municipal Charter Law) under Council-Manager plan B, as implemented on July 1, 1970, by direct petition. The village is one of 42 municipalities (of the 564) statewide governed under this form. The governing body is comprised of five council members who are responsible to hire and oversee a professional Village Manager who has full executive power for all departments. The government consists of five council members, with all positions elected at-large in nonpartisan elections to serve four-year terms on a staggered basis, with either two or three seats coming up for election in even-numbered years on the second Tuesday in November. At a reorganization meeting held in January after newly elected council members take office, the council chooses a mayor and deputy mayor from among its members for two-year terms, with the mayor presiding over Council meetings, but without any executive authority. The Village Council appoints a Village Manager to oversee the day-to-day operations of the Village, to handle personnel, citizen inquiries and complaints, and to handle the administrative duties of the Village. The Village Council passes local laws, makes appointments to various Boards and Committees, and awards various contracts for purchases of goods and services used by the Village. They also review, amend, and adopt the annual budget for the Village prepared by the Village Manager and Chief Financial Officer.

, members of the Ridgewood Village Council are Mayor Paul Vagianos (term ends December 31, 2026), Deputy Mayor Pamela Perron (2024), Lorraine Reynolds (2024), Evan Weitz (2026) and Siobhan Winograd (2026).

In August 2021, councilmember Bernadette Walsh resigned from the seat expiring in December 2024, which was left temporarily vacant. In the November 2021 general election, Paul Vagianos was elected to serve the balance of the term of office.

In the November 2020 general election, voters approved by a 59%-41% margin a referendum that would move school and municipal elections (which had been held in April and May respectively) so that they were included as part of the November general election. The supporters of the initiative argued that the shift would "save money, improve turnout and improve security at schools where elections are held". The village council challenged the results of the referendum, but the village lost in Superior Court and had the ruling affirmed on appeal in March 2021, with the judge ruling that the village clerk had acted "improperly and unlawfully" in seeking to block the referendum.

Ridgewood is one of only four municipalities in New Jersey with the village type of government, joining Loch Arbour, Ridgefield Park and South Orange.

Federal, state and county representation
Ridgewood is located in the 5th Congressional District and is part of New Jersey's 40th state legislative district.

Politics
As of March 2011, there were a total of 15,983 registered voters in Ridgewood, of which 4,727 (29.6% vs. 31.7% countywide) were registered as Democrats, 4,125 (25.8% vs. 21.1%) were registered as Republicans and 7,118 (44.5% vs. 47.1%) were registered as Unaffiliated. There were 13 voters registered as Libertarians or Greens. Among the village's 2010 Census population, 64.0% (vs. 57.1% in Bergen County) were registered to vote, including 92.4% of those ages 18 and over (vs. 73.7% countywide).

In the 2016 presidential election, Democrat Hillary Clinton received 8,000 votes (60.4% vs. 54.2% countywide), ahead of Republican Donald Trump with 4,576 votes (34.6% vs. 41.1%) and other candidates with 665 votes (5.0% vs. 4.6%), among the 13,308 ballots cast by the village's 17,892 registered voters, for a turnout of 74.4% (vs. 72.5% in Bergen County). In the 2012 presidential election, Democrat Barack Obama received 6,181 votes here (50.5% vs. 54.8% countywide), ahead of Republican Mitt Romney with 5,852 votes (47.8% vs. 43.5%) and other candidates with 130 votes (1.1% vs. 0.9%), among the 12,232 ballots cast by the village's 17,124 registered voters, for a turnout of 71.4% (vs. 70.4% in Bergen County). In the 2008 presidential election, Democrat Barack Obama received 7,387 votes here (55.5% vs. 53.9% countywide), ahead of Republican John McCain with 5,743 votes (43.2% vs. 44.5%) and other candidates with 80 votes (0.6% vs. 0.8%), among the 13,306 ballots cast by the village's 16,867 registered voters, for a turnout of 78.9% (vs. 76.8% in Bergen County). In the 2004 presidential election, Democrat John Kerry received 6,656 votes here (50.7% vs. 51.7% countywide), ahead of Republican George W. Bush with 6,357 votes (48.4% vs. 47.2%) and other candidates with 94 votes (0.7% vs. 0.7%), among the 13,141 ballots cast by the village's 16,325 registered voters, for a turnout of 80.5% (vs. 76.9% in the whole county).

In the 2013 gubernatorial election, Republican Chris Christie received 62.9% of the vote (4,259 cast), ahead of Democrat Barbara Buono with 36.2% (2,453 votes), and other candidates with 0.9% (59 votes), among the 6,864 ballots cast by the village's 16,103 registered voters (93 ballots were spoiled), for a turnout of 42.6%. In the 2009 gubernatorial election, Republican Chris Christie received 4,192 votes here (48.8% vs. 45.8% countywide), ahead of Democrat Jon Corzine with 3,885 votes (45.3% vs. 48.0%), Independent Chris Daggett with 423 votes (4.9% vs. 4.7%) and other candidates with 44 votes (0.5% vs. 0.5%), among the 8,582 ballots cast by the village's 16,509 registered voters, yielding a 52.0% turnout (vs. 50.0% in the county).

Education

The Ridgewood Public Schools serves students in pre-kindergarten through twelfth grade. As of the 2020–21 school year, the district, comprised of 10 schools, had an enrollment of 5,613 students and 432.6 classroom teachers (on an FTE basis), for a student–teacher ratio of 13.0:1. Schools in the district (with 2020–21 enrollment data from the National Center for Education Statistics) are 
Glen School with 60 students in PreK and Private Day Care Center, 
Henrietta Hawes Elementary School with 593 students in grades K-5, 
Orchard Elementary School with 299 students in grades K-5, 
Ridge Elementary School with 443 students in grades K-5, 
Irwin B. Somerville Elementary School with 383 students in grades K-5, 
Ira W. Travell Elementary School with 377 students in grades K-5, 
Willard Elementary School with 461 students in grades K-5, 
Benjamin Franklin Middle School with 698 students in grades 6-8, 
George Washington Middle School with 666 students in grades 6-8 and 
Ridgewood High School with 1,775 students in grades 9-12.

The district's high school was the 28th-ranked public high school in New Jersey out of 339 schools statewide in New Jersey Monthly magazine's September 2014 cover story on the state's "Top Public High Schools", using a new ranking methodology. The school had been ranked 28th in the state of 328 schools in 2012, after being ranked 20th in 2010 out of 322 schools listed. The school was ranked 606th in U.S. News & World Report national rankings for 2019.

According to the New Jersey Department of Education, Ridgewood is a socioeconomic District Factor Group of J, the highest of eight categories.

Public school students from the village, and all of Bergen County, are eligible to attend the secondary education programs offered by the Bergen County Technical Schools, which include the Bergen County Academies in Hackensack, and the Bergen Tech campus in Teterboro or Paramus. The district offers programs on a shared-time or full-time basis, with admission based on an extremely selective and competitive application process and tuition covered by the student's home school district.

The Holmstead School serves students of high school age with high intellectual potential who have not succeeded in traditional school settings. Students are placed in the school by referral from their home public school districts, with tuition paid for by the school district.

Preschools in Ridgewood include Bethlehem Early Learning Center, West Side Presbyterian, First Presbyterian School, the Cooperative Nursery School of Ridgewood, and the Montessori Learning Center

Local media
The village of Ridgewood is served by two weekly community newspapers, The Ridgewood News and the Ridgewood Suburban News, both of which are published by North Jersey Media Group. The daily newspaper for the region is The Record which is also published by North Jersey Media Group. The company's website, NorthJersey.com, has a Ridgewood town page that includes local coverage from all three of these papers. Patch Media provides Ridgewood with its own daily news website, which offers news, events, announcements and Local Voices.

Transportation

Roads and highways

Major roads that pass through Ridgewood include New Jersey Route 17, Franklin Turnpike, County Route 84 (commonly known as East and West Ridgewood Avenue) and County Route 507 (Maple Avenue).

Public transportation
The Ridgewood train station is served by the NJ Transit Main Line as well as the Bergen County Line. The station features three platforms. The first is for all trains headed south toward Hoboken Terminal. The second is for Bergen County Line trains headed in the same direction, and the third is for Main Line trains headed toward Suffern and Port Jervis. NJ Transit trains on both the Bergen County and the Main Lines go to Hoboken, stopping at Secaucus Junction, for transfers to trains to Penn Station in Midtown Manhattan and other destinations served by the station. Parking is limited near the Ridgewood train station. Taxicabs are available at the train station; the taxi building is on the northbound platform.

NJ Transit buses in Ridgewood include the 148, 163 and 164 to the Port Authority Bus Terminal in Midtown Manhattan, the 175 to the George Washington Bridge Bus Station, and local service offered on the 722 (to Paramus Park and Paterson), 746 (to Paterson, as Ridgewood is its terminus) and 752 (to Hackensack) routes. Except for the 148 route, all the others stop at NJ Transit's Ridgewood Bus Terminal on Van Neste Square.

Short Line offers service along Route 17 to the Port Authority Bus Terminal, as well as to the George Washington Bridge Bus Station and down the East Side on Manhattan to 23rd Street.

Notable people

People who were born in, residents of, or otherwise closely associated with Ridgewood include:

 Jim Alexander (born 1935), documentary photographer, photojournalist and activist
 Elizabeth Akers Allen (1832–1911), poet and journalist
 Joe Antonacci (born 1960), boxing ring announcer and emcee
 David Baas (born 1981), offensive lineman who played for the New York Giants
 Adam Badeau (1831–1895), Union Army brevet brigadier general and author
 Robert T. Bakker (born 1945), paleontologist, whose research helped support the theory that some dinosaurs were warm-blooded
 MC Paul Barman (born 1974), rapper
 Amelia Edith Huddleston Barr (1831–1919), British novelist
 Guy Benson (born 1985), conservative talk radio personality who has been a Fox News contributor
 Andy Blitz (born 1971), comedian, writer, producer and actor best known for his sketch comedy and writing work on the late-night talk show Late Night with Conan O'Brien
 Jeffrey Blitz, filmmaker who directed the 2002 documentary Spellbound and the 2007 film Rocket Science
 Jim Bouton (1939–2019), former Major League Baseball pitcher who wrote the tell-all book Ball Four
 Dave Butler (born 1987), former American football linebacker who played for the Cleveland Browns
 Phillip Bush (born 1961), classical pianist, with a career focusing primarily on chamber music and contemporary classical music
 Brenda Buttner (1961–2017), senior business correspondent and host of Bulls & Bears on Fox News
 John Chester Buttre (1821–1893), steel-plate engraver and lithographer, responsible for some 3,000 engraved portraits of American political, naval and military personalities
 Martha Byrne (born 1969), actress who performed on Broadway as a child in Annie and as an adult in the role of Lily Walsh in As the World Turns
 Peter Carlisle (born 1952), mayor of Honolulu
 Carolyn Christov-Bakargiev (born 1957), writer, art historian and curator who was the Artistic Director of dOCUMENTA (13)
 Harlan Coben (born 1962), The New York Times best-selling author of Promise Me, Tell No One and No Second Chance
 Tabatha Coffey (born 1967), contestant (and Fan Favorite winner) on season one of Bravo's Shear Genius and host of Tabatha's Salon Takeover
 Leonard A. Cole (born 1933), dentist, political scientist and expert on bioterrorism and terror medicine
 Jerry Coleman (1924–2014), former second baseman for the New York Yankees, baseball sportscaster
 Kelly Conheeney (born 1991), soccer player who plays as a midfielder for Sky Blue FC in the NWSL
 Christopher J. Connors (born 1956), politician who represents the 9th district in the New Jersey Senate
 Paul M. Cook (born 1924), founder and CEO of Raychem, a chemical manufacturing company that reached $2 billion in annual revenue
 Martin Courtney (born 1985), musician, singer, member of American indie rock band Real Estate
 Megan Crane (born ), novelist
 Andy Daly (born 1971), actor, comedian, and writer best known for starring as Forrest MacNeil on the Comedy Central series Review
 Toshiko D'Elia (born 1930), masters athletics long-distance runner
 Meghan Daum (born 1970), author who writes for the Los Angeles Times
 Barbara Demick, author of Nothing to Envy
 Todd Demsey (born 1972), professional golfer
 Fairleigh Dickinson Jr. (1919–1996), member of the New Jersey Senate from 1968 to 1971 who sponsored the 1969 legislation that created the Hackensack Meadowlands Development Commission
 Anne Donovan (1961-2018), three-time basketball All-American at Old Dominion University and three-time Olympic team member. Ranked #8 on the Sports Illustrated list of The 50 Greatest New Jersey Sports Figures
 Charles L. Drake (1924–1997), geologist who was professor of geology at Dartmouth College
 Gerry Duggan (born 1974), comic book writer
 Fred DuVal (born 1954), businessman, civic leader, and author who is vice president of Clean Energy Fuels and was the Democratic nominee in the 2014 Arizona gubernatorial election
 W. Cary Edwards (1944–2010), former member of the New Jersey General Assembly who served as New Jersey Attorney General from 1986 to 1989
 Niles Eldredge (born 1943), paleontologist
 Jeff Feagles (born 1966), Punter for the National Football League New York Giants
 Mike Ferguson (born 1970), politician who served as member of the United States House of Representatives representing New Jersey's 7th congressional district from 2001 to 2009
 Josh Flitter (born 1994), child actor who appeared in Ace Ventura Jr.: Pet Detective
 Ray Forrest (1916–1999), pioneering TV announcer, host and news broadcaster from the early TV era
 Varian Fry (1907–1967), journalist who helped save 2,000 to 4,000 anti-Nazi and Jewish refugees from persecution and deportation in Vichy France during The Holocaust, most notably the French artist Marc Chagall
 Louis Gambaccini (1931–2018), transportation official who served as general manager of the Port Authority Trans Hudson rail system and as New Jersey commissioner of transportation
 Bill Geist (born 1945), correspondent on CBS News Sunday Morning
 Arnold Gingrich (1903–1976), editor and co-founder of Esquire magazine
 John P. Ginty (born 1965), financial data analyst and politician who was a candidate in 2006 for the Republican nomination for U.S. Senate
 Gina Glantz (born ), political strategist, campaign manager, field director, and consultant
 Abraham Godwin (1724–1777), one of the first settlers of the area around Ridgewood
 Abraham Godwin (1763–1835), brigadier general in the War of 1812, for whom Godwinville was named
 Abraham Godwin Jr. (1791–1849), worked to name part of Franklin as Godwinville
 Roger Curtis Green (1932–2009), archaeologist of South Pacific civilizations
 Joe Harasymiak (born 1986), head coach for the Maine Black Bears football team
 Elizabeth Hawes (1903–1971), clothing designer, outspoken critic of the fashion industry, and champion of ready to wear
 Daniel Henninger (born 1945/46), The Wall Street Journal columnist
 Jason Heyward (born 1989), outfielder for the Chicago Cubs
 Sonny Igoe (1923–2012), jazz drummer
 Cosmo Jarvis (born 1989), singer-songwriter
 Frankie Jonas (born 2000), actor who was a voice actor in the film Ponyo and a recurring character in the television series Jonas
 Margaret Juntwait (1957–2015), the voice of the Metropolitan Opera radio broadcasts
 Jay Kennedy (1956–2007), editor and writer who joined King Features Syndicate in 1988 as deputy comics editor and was named as editor-in-chief in 1997
 Walter M. D. Kern (born 1937), politician who served in the New Jersey General Assembly from 1978 to 1990, where he represented the 40th district
 Grace Kim (born 1968), former professional tennis player
 Peter S. Kim (born ), president of Merck Research Laboratories
 Richard Kollmar (1910–1971), stage, radio, film and television actor, television personality and Broadway producer
 Younghoe Koo (born 1994), NFL kicker who has played for the Atlanta Falcons
 Bowie Kuhn (1926–2007), Commissioner of Baseball from 1969 to 1984
 L.A. Beast (born 1984 as Kevin Strahle), competitive eater
 Jeffrey M. Lacker (born 1955), president of the Federal Reserve Bank of Richmond
 Mike Laga (born 1960), Major League Baseball player from 1982 to 1990
 John Lantigua (born 1947), journalist and crime novelist who has won the Pulitzer Prize and Robert F. Kennedy Journalism Award for his investigative reporting on Latin American issues
 Robert Sean Leonard (born 1969), Tony Award-winning actor, current regular in TV series House
 Cornelis Lievense (1890–1949), Dutch businessman who ran several import/export companies in the United States from the 1920s through the 1940s
 Alfred Lutter (born 1962), actor and consultant best known for his performances in Alice Doesn't Live Here Anymore and The Bad News Bears
 Martha MacCallum (born 1964), news anchor on Fox News Channel
 Herbert F. Maddalene (born 1932), architect who was a partner in the firm of Genovese & Maddalene 
 David Madden (born 1981), founder and executive director of both the National History Bee and the National History Bowl who was a 19-day champion on Jeopardy!
 Paul Mara (born 1979), National Hockey League defenceman who has played for the Montreal Canadiens and New York Rangers
 Marion Clyde McCarroll (1891–1977), writer and journalist who was the first woman issued a press pass by the New York Stock Exchange and also penned the "Advice for the Lovelorn, a nationally syndicated column, after she inherited it from Dorothy Dix
 Thomas B. McGuire Jr. (1920–1945), the second-leading air ace in World War II, who was killed in action on January 7, 1945, and awarded the Medal of Honor posthumously. McGuire Air Force Base is named in his memory
 Julia Meade (1925–2016), film and stage actress who was a frequent pitch person in live commercials in the early days of television in the 1950s, most notably on The Ed Sullivan Show
 Michael Mercurio (born 1972), actor who has appeared in film, theatre, and television, often portraying psychologically disturbed characters
 Matt Mondanile (born 1985), guitarist, singer and songwriter
 Elisabeth Moore (1876–1959), tennis player who won the singles title at the U.S. Championships on four occasions and was inducted into the International Tennis Hall of Fame in 1971
 Richard Muenz (born 1948), actor and baritone singer best known for his theatrical work
 Frankie Muniz (born 1985), actor
 Helen Nearing (1904–1995), author and advocate of simple living
 Pete Nelson (born 1962), master treehouse builder, author and host of the Animal Planet television show Treehouse Masters
 Kim Ng (born 1968), senior vice-president for baseball operations of Major League Baseball
 Buddy Nielsen (born 1984), singer of the rock band Senses Fail
 Tom Nolan, publisher of Golf World
 Jeffrey Nordling (born 1962), actor known for Dirt, 24, Desperate Housewives, and Big Little Lies
 Helen O'Bannon (1939–1988), economist who served as the secretary of public welfare of Pennsylvania
 John Joseph O'Hara (born 1946), auxiliary bishop of the Roman Catholic Archdiocese of New York
 Patti O'Reilly (born 1968), former professional tennis player
 Evanka Osmak (born 1980), sports anchor for Sportsnet
 Richard and Joan Ostling (born 1940 and 1939–2009 respectively), co-authors of Mormon America: The Power and the Promise.
 Nikki Phillips (born 1987), American-born Polish soccer defender and midfielder who has played with FC Kansas City in the NWSL and for the Poland national team
 Jack Pitney (1963–2010), marketing executive with BMW as vice president of marketing, where he played a major role in convincing company leadership to go ahead with distribution of the MINI in the United States, despite concerns that car buyers there would not buy cars that small given the popularity of sport utility vehicles
 Cassie Ramone (born 1986) and Katy Goodman of the indie rock band Vivian Girls
 William Remington (1917–1954), Soviet spy convicted of perjury
 Amanda Renee, romance novelist
 Chico Resch (born 1948), hockey sportscaster and former NHL goalie who lived in the village when he played for the New Jersey Devils
 Bobby Richardson (born 1935), former second baseman for the New York Yankees
 Nelson Riddle (1921–1985), musician and arranger for various artists such as Frank Sinatra and Ella Fitzgerald
 Beatrice Schroeder Rose (1922–2014), author, composer, harpist and teacher, who was the principal harpist of the Houston Symphony for 31 years
 Eric S. Rosengren (born 1957), President of the Federal Reserve Bank of Boston
 Marge Roukema (1929–2014), politician who served as a member of the United States House of Representatives
 Henry Rowan (1923–2015), engineer and philanthropist, for whom Rowan University was renamed, after he made a $100 million donation to the school
 Bob Sall (1908–1974), race car driver who drove in the 1935 Indianapolis 500 and was inducted into the National Sprint Car Hall of Fame in 1992
 Scottie Scheffler (born 1996), professional golfer who plays on the PGA Tour
 David Schenker (born 1968), diplomat who has served as Assistant Secretary of State for Near Eastern Affairs
 Kieran Scott (born 1974), author of Private and I Was a Non-Blonde Cheerleader
 Bob Sebra (born 1961), MLB player for the Texas Rangers, Montreal Expos, Philadelphia Phillies, Cincinnati Reds, and the Milwaukee Brewers
 Irving Selikoff (1915–1992), physician and medical researcher who in the 1960s established a link between the inhalation of asbestos particles and lung-related ailments, whose work is largely responsible for the current strict regulation of asbestos
 Jordin Sparks (born 1989), American Idol winner, lived here as a child while her father played with the Giants
 Phillippi Sparks (born 1969), former NFL cornerback who played most of his career with the New York Giants
 Michael Springer (born 1979), former MLL player
 Ali Stroker (born 1987), actress, singer and winner of the 2019 Tony Award for Best Featured Actress in a Musical for her performance as Ado Annie in "Oklahoma". She is the first actress who needs a wheelchair for mobility known to have appeared on a Broadway stage
* Sub Urban (born 1999), singer, songwriter and producer best known for his song "Cradles"
 Kyle Teel (born 2002) college baseball catcher for the Virginia Cavaliers.
 Wayne Tippit (1932–2009), character actor who appeared in Melrose Place and lived in Ridgewood until 1990
 Casper Van Dien (born 1968), actor, Starship Troopers, Sleepy Hollow. Van Dien Avenue is named for his great-great-great-grandfather
 Don Van Natta Jr. (born 1964), journalist and writer who has been an investigative reporter for ESPN and had been an investigative correspondent at The New York Times, where he was a member of two teams that won Pulitzer Prizes
 David Van Tieghem (born 1955), percussionist, composer and sound designer
 Melinda Wagner (born 1957), composer, winner of the 1999 Pulitzer Prize in music
 Ayelet Waldman (born 1964), Israeli-American novelist and essayist, who has written seven mystery novels in the series The Mommy-Track Mysteries and four other novels
 Bill Ward (1919–1998), cartoonist notable as a good girl artist and creator of the risqué comics character Torchy
 Douglas Watt (1914–2009), theater critic for the Daily News
 Bill Wielechowski (born 1967), member of the Alaska Senate, representing the J District since 2006
 Brian Williams (born 1959), journalist
 George Witte, poet and book editor
 Michael Zegen (born 1979), actor best known for his role as Joel Maisel on The Marvelous Mrs. Maisel

Points of interest
The Ridgewood Post Office was the site of a postal killing in 1991, where a former postal worker, Joseph M. Harris, killed his former supervisor, Carol Ott, with a katana and shot her fiancé, Cornelius Kasten Jr., at their home. The following morning, on October 10, 1991, Harris shot and killed two mail handlers at the Ridgewood Post Office.

Warner Theater is a Bow Tie Cinema located on East Ridgewood Avenue.

References

Sources 
 Municipal Incorporations of the State of New Jersey (according to Counties) prepared by the Division of Local Government, Department of the Treasury (New Jersey); December 1, 1958.
 Clayton, W. Woodford; and Nelson, William. History of Bergen and Passaic Counties, New Jersey, with Biographical Sketches of Many of its Pioneers and Prominent Men, Philadelphia: Everts and Peck, 1882.
 Harvey, Cornelius Burnham (ed.), Genealogical History of Hudson and Bergen Counties, New Jersey. New York: New Jersey Genealogical Publishing Co., 1900.
 Parrillo, Vincent; Parrillo, Beth; and Wrubel, Arthur. Ridgewood, Arcadia Publishing, 1999. .
 Van Valen, James M. History of Bergen County, New Jersey. New York: New Jersey Publishing and Engraving Co., 1900.
 Westervelt, Frances A. (Frances Augusta), 1858–1942, History of Bergen County, New Jersey, 1630–1923, Lewis Historical Publishing Company, 1923.

External links

 Village of Ridgewood website
 
 Data for the Ridgewood Public Schools, National Center for Education Statistics

 
1894 establishments in New Jersey
Faulkner Act (council–manager)
Populated places established in 1894
Villages in Bergen County, New Jersey